Eriocraniella platyptera is a moth of the family Eriocraniidae. It was described by Davis in 1978. It is found in north-western New York.

The wingspan is 7.8-8.2 mm for males and about 8.2 mm for females. The forewings are relatively broad and immaculate dark fuscous with a prominent golden brassy to blue green iridescence. The hindwings are much paler, grayish fuscous with a slight purplish luster. The scales are moderately broad. Adults are on wing in May in one generation per year.

References

Moths described in 1978
Eriocraniidae